The Amazing Bud Powell, also called The Amazing Bud Powell, Vol. 1, is an album by jazz pianist Bud Powell, first released on Blue Note in April 1952, as a 10" vinyl. It is part of a loosely connected series with the 1954 companion The Amazing Bud Powell, Vol. 2 and the 1957 Bud! The Amazing Bud Powell (Vol. 3), all released on Blue Note. The album details two recording sessions. In the first, recorded on August 9, 1949, Powell performed in quintet with Fats Navarro, Sonny Rollins, Tommy Potter and Roy Haynes, and in trio with Potter and Haynes. In the second, on May 1, 1951, Powell performed in trio with Curley Russell and Max Roach, and solo.

The album is critically prized among Powell's releases. Among the more discussed of the album's tracks is the pianist's composition "Un Poco Loco" ("A Little Crazy"), which has been singled out by critics and cultural historians for its musical and cultural significance.

The album was remastered and re-issued on CD in 1989 in chronological order with additional, alternate takes. This version is also available along with Powell's 1947 Roost session on the first disc of The Complete Blue Note and Roost Recordings, a 4 disc box set. The album was remastered again in 2001 by Rudy Van Gelder and re-issued as part of Blue Note's The RVG Edition series, with further expansion and reorganization.

Critical reception 

The album is rated highly within Powell's musical library, described by All About Jazz as "among the pianist's most important recordings" and by The Complete Idiot's Guide to Jazz (in conjunction with volume two) as "a great introduction to this awesome pianist". Jazz critic Scott Yanow characterized it in his book Jazz on Record as "full of essential music". The Penguin Guide to Jazz Recordings included the album in its suggested “core collection” of essential recordings.

In Bebop: The Best Musicians and Recordings, Yanow identifies among the highlights of the album "Bouncing with Bud", "52nd Street Theme" and "Dance of the Infidels," performed by the "very exciting quintet" of 1949, and also the 1951 trio's "three stunning versions of 'Un Poco Loco'". Barry Kernfeld in The Blackwell Guide to Recorded Jazz notes with regards to "Un Poco Loco" that "the three takes [of the song]...enable us to hear the evolution of a masterpiece", a label with which a critic at The New York Times concurred.

While the song "Un Poco Loco" has been identified as musically outstanding, it has also been discussed as culturally significant. According to Race Music: Black Cultures from Bebop to Hip-Hop, although Afro-Cuban jazz had been introduced in the 1940s by such artists as Dizzy Gillespie and Machito, "Un Poco Loco" is a significant marker in the establishment of this musical genre, as it revealed "the Afro-Cuban turn settling into bebop's acceptable field of rhetorical conventions". More than Afro-Cuban, the authors of that book detect what they describe as a "Pan-African" musical influence in the composition's repetition, harmony and cyclic solo that, while not as obviously Afro-international as Gillespie's "A Night in Tunisia', "certainly signaled a 'blackness' that became part of the language of subsequent expressions of modern jazz." The book Jazz 101 indicates that Powell's performances of this material in 1951 was "all the more astonishing" in its "level of creativity, and even authenticity" because little was known at the time of African music or how Latin music (aside from the Cuban influence) could be applied to jazz. According to Yanow, in Afro-Cuban Jazz: The Essential Listening Companion, this composition was Powell's only involvement with Afro-Cuban Jazz.

Releases 
The album was first released in April 1952 as a 10" LP in Blue Note's 5000 series (BLP 5003). This collected together eight tracks (four from each session) that had previously been released as 78 rpm singles in 1949 and 1951: "You Go To My Head c/w Ornithology" (BN 1566), "Bouncing With Bud c/w Wail" (BN 1567), "Over The Rainbow c/w A Night In Tunisia" (BN 1576), and "Un Poco Loco c/w It Could Happen To You" (BN 1577).

In March 1956, the album was re-issued as a 12" LP (BLP 1503), with seven additional tracks (including alternate takes, then a rarity) from both sessions, while "You Go to My Head" from the first session, and "Over the Rainbow" and "It Could Happen To You" (master take) from the second were moved to The Amazing Bud Powell, Vol. 2, initiating the spread of the two sessions between the two volumes. This track listing was kept for the first digital remastering in 1985, when the album was re-issued on vinyl and cassette.

In 1989, the album was digitally remastered and released on CD. This time the tracks were listed in session chronological order, which involved "A Night in Tunisia" (both takes), "It Could Happen to You" (alternate take) and "Parisian Thoroughfare" moving to The Amazing Bud Powell, Vol. 2 and "You Go to My Head", "Ornithology" (alternate take) and "Over the Rainbow" moving back. Three further alternate takes from the 1949 session were added, completing the session on this volume. The 1951 session still straddled the two volumes.

In 2001, Rudy Van Gelder remastered the album from scratch (he'd previously been credited with disc transfers on the 1989 remaster), and the album was re-issued as part of Blue Note's The RVG Edition series. This release finally united the two complete sessions on one disc, with all second session material on Vol. 2 being transferred. The track listing was also altered so that alternate takes were grouped after the master takes of each session, avoiding the somewhat relentless take repetition of the 1989 release.

Track listing 
Except where otherwise noted, all songs composed by Bud Powell.

1952 10" LP (BLP 5003) 
 "Un Poco Loco" – 4:42
 "Over the Rainbow" (Harold Arlen, E.Y. "Yip" Harburg) – 2:55
 "Ornithology" (Benny Harris, Charlie Parker) – 2:20
 "Wail" – 3:02
 "A Night in Tunisia" (Dizzy Gillespie, Frank Paparelli) – 4:12
 "It Could Happen to You" (Johnny Burke, Jimmy Van Heusen) – 3:12
 "You Go to My Head" (J. Fred Coots, Haven Gillespie) – 3:11
 "Bouncing with Bud" (Gil Fuller, Powell) – 3:01

1956 12" LP (BLP 1503) 
 "Un Poco Loco" (alternate take #1) – 3:46
 "Un Poco Loco" (alternate take #2) – 4:28
 "Un Poco Loco" – 4:42
 "Dance of the Infidels" – 2:50
 "52nd Street Theme" (Thelonious Monk) – 2:45
 "It Could Happen to You" (alternate take) (Burke, Van Heusen) – 3:12
 "A Night in Tunisia" (alternate take) (Gillespie, Paparelli) – 3:49
 "A Night in Tunisia" (Gillespie, Paparelli) – 4:12
 "Wail" – 3:02
 "Ornithology" (Harris, Parker) – 2:20
 "Bouncing with Bud" (Fuller, Powell) – 3:01
 "Parisian Thoroughfare" – 3:23

1989 CD 
 "Bouncing with Bud" (alternate take #1) (Fuller, Powell) – 3:03
 "Bouncing with Bud" (alternate take #2) (Fuller, Powell) – 3:12
 "Bouncing with Bud" (Fuller, Powell) – 3:01
 "Wail" (alternate take) – 2:38
 "Wail" – 3:02
 "Dance of the Infidels" (alternate take) – 2:52
 "Dance of the Infidels" – 2:50
 "52nd Street Theme" (Monk) – 2:45
 "You Go to My Head" (Coots, H. Gillespie) – 3:11
 "Ornithology" (Harris, Parker) – 2:20
 "Ornithology" (alternate take) (Harris, Parker) – 3:07
 "Un Poco Loco" (alternate take #1) – 3:46
 "Un Poco Loco" (alternate take #2) – 4:28
 "Un Poco Loco" – 4:42
 "Over the Rainbow" (Arlen, Harburg) – 2:55

2001 CD The RVG Edition 
 "Bouncing with Bud" (Fuller, Powell) – 3:04
 "Wail" – 3:06
 "Dance of the Infidels" – 2:54
 "52nd Street Theme" (Monk) – 2:50
 "You Go to My Head" (Coots, H. Gillespie) – 3:15
 "Ornithology" (Harris, Parker) – 2:23
 "Bouncing with Bud" (Alternate take #1)– 3:06
 "Bouncing with Bud" (Alternate take #2) – 3:16
 "Wail" (Alternate take) – 2:42
 "Dance of the Infidels" (Alternate take) – 2:51
 "Ornithology" (Alternate take) – 3:12
 "Un Poco Loco" – 4:46
 "Over the Rainbow" (Arlen, Harburg) – 2:59
 "A Night in Tunisia" (Gillespie, Paparelli) – 4:17
 "It Could Happen to You" (Burke, Van Heusen) – 3:17
 "Parisian Thoroughfare" – 3:26
 "Un Poco Loco" (Alternate take #1) – 3:49
 "Un Poco Loco" (Alternate take #2) – 4:32
 "A Night in Tunisia" (Alternate take) – 3:53
 "It Could Happen to You" (Alternate take) – 2:23

Personnel

Performance 
August 9, 1949 session: tracks 1-11 (referring to the 2001 CD release).
 Fats Navarro – trumpet (tracks 1–4, 7–10)
 Sonny Rollins – tenor sax (tracks 1–4, 7–10)
 Bud Powell – piano (all)
 Tommy Potter – bass (all)
 Roy Haynes – drums (all)

May 1, 1951 session: tracks 12-20.
 Bud Powell – piano (all)
 Curly Russell – bass (tracks 12, 14, 16–19)
 Max Roach – drums (tracks 12, 14, 16–19)

Production 
 Bob Blumenthal – liner notes (2001 CD)
 Michael Cuscuna – producer
 Leonard Feather – liner notes (LP and 1989 CD)
 Doug Hawkins – recording engineer
 John Hermansader – cover design
 Alfred Lion – producer, original session producer
 Ron McMaster – digital transfers (1989 CD)
 Rudy Van Gelder – disc transfers (1989 CD); disc transfers, digital audio restoration and mastering (2001 CD)
 Francis Wolff – photography, cover photo

References

External links 
 NPR Basic Jazz Record Library entry, with audio samples.
 Bud Powell at jazzdisco.org

Bud Powell albums
1952 albums
Albums produced by Alfred Lion
Blue Note Records albums
Album series
Albums produced by Michael Cuscuna